The genus Thryonomys, also known as the cane rats or grasscutters, is a genus of rodent found throughout Africa south of the Sahara, the only members of the family Thryonomyidae. They are eaten in some African countries and are a pest species on many crops. The family name comes from the Greek word thryon, meaning a "rush" or "reed" and mys meaning "mouse".

Characteristics
Cane rats range in body length from 35–60 centimetres. They commonly weigh 6-7 kilograms in captivity, and can attain weights up to 10 kilograms in the wild. They are heavily built rodents, with bristly brown fur speckled with yellow or grey. They live in marshy areas and along river and lake banks, and are herbivores, feeding on aquatic grasses in the wild. In agricultural areas they will – as the name suggests – feed on sugarcane in plantations, making them a significant crop pest.

Females give birth to litters of 2–4 young at least once a year, and more frequently in some areas. Cane rats are sexually mature and able to reproduce at 6 months of age.

Relationship with humans
Cane rats are widely distributed and farmers expend substantial energy fencing the rodents out of their fields, but they are also valued as a source of "bush meat" in West and Central Africa. Like the guinea pig, their meat is of a higher protein but lower fat content than conventional livestock; it is also appreciated for its tenderness and taste.

In the savanna area of West Africa, people have traditionally captured wild cane rats and fattened them in captivity. More recently, intensive production of cane rats has been undertaken in countries such as Benin and Togo and agricultural extension services in Cameroon, Côte d'Ivoire, Gabon, Ghana, Nigeria, Senegal, and the Democratic Republic of Congo have also encouraged farmers to rear these rodents in rural and peri-urban areas. Research carried out over the last two decades has allowed the selection and improvement of stock for captivity and much of the knowledge and techniques for cane rat breeding has been determined from work carried out at the Benin-Germany breeding station, which was established in the mid-1980s. Practical information is now more readily available for farmers interested in cane rat breeding, but training is still advised.

Cane rats are not the most prolific of rodent species, but the high demand, attractive market price, and the small amount of investment required makes cane rats a suitable mini-livestock activity for income generation in many parts of West and Central Africa.

Conservation status
There are areas where they have been over-hunted, and savanna habitat is often at risk during the dry season from bushfires, which are lit during bushmeat hunting expeditions. However, the high exploitation of cane rats in the wild has not had a serious effect on their numbers, and in fact some researchers believe that their populations may actually be increasing due to deforestation and changing land use patterns in West Africa as they have adapted to deforested areas and occur in close proximity to farmlands and people.

References

External links
 

Rodents by common name
Hystricognath rodents
Extant Eocene first appearances
Taxa named by Leopold Fitzinger